Mphaki is a community council located in the Quthing District of Lesotho. Its population in 2006 was 20,288.

Villages
The community of Mphaki includes the villages of: 
 
 Aupolasi (Tlokoeng)
 Aupolasi (Tšitsong)
 Borokoana
 Ha 'Moloki
 Ha Binare
 Ha Feke
 Ha Folosiri
 Ha Kelebone
 Ha Khethisa
 Ha Komntanta
 Ha Kooko
 Ha Kurulane
 Ha Lazaro (Liteleng)
 Ha Lazaro (Lithakong)
 Ha Lebeko
 Ha Lefelisa
 Ha Lethena
 Ha Machesetsa
 Ha Machesetsa (Taung)
 Ha Machesetsa (Thoteng)
 Ha Maeke
 Ha Mafa
 Ha Mahlomola
 Ha Makatikele
 Ha Makoae
 Ha Malimabe
 Ha Mantsoinyana
 Ha Maphasa
 Ha Maruping
 Ha Masenkane
 Ha Matsie
 Ha Mohapi
 Ha Mohloli
 Ha Moifo
 Ha Mokhethi
 Ha Mokhosi
 Ha Mokoena
 Ha Moreba
 Ha Mosetlelo (Ha Masiu)
 Ha Motau
 Ha Moteane (Mokhoabong)
 Ha Motjoli
 Ha Motseko (Lekhalong)
 Ha Motsiri
 Ha Noko
 Ha Nthunya
 Ha Pali
 Ha Patereisi
 Ha Peete
 Ha Peterose
 Ha Pheello
 Ha Pitso
 Ha Pokisi
 Ha Qhoenya
 Ha Queen
 Ha Rafabia
 Ha Ramosetsanyane
 Ha Ramotsoanyane (Ha Masiu)
 Ha Rantsoelepa (Tiping)
 Ha Rasepelemane
 Ha Rasepelemane (Koluololo)
 Ha Rasepelemane (Trouble Case)
 Ha Rasepelemane (Tsekong)
 Ha Sebota
 Ha Sera
 Ha Setsena
 Ha Thaha
 Ha Tlali
 Ha Tlhaku
 Ha Tlhaku (Maqhenebeng)
 Ha Tokelo
 Ha Tsenki
 Ha Tsepane
 Ha Tšiu (Sebubeng)
 Ha Tsoene
 Kelebone (Ha Motlhotlo)
 Khakeng
 Khakeng (Maphepheng)
 Khakeng (Meeling)
 Khakeng (Thabaneng)
 Khalong-la-Likhama (Tšethe)
 Khohong (Ha Mokhethi)
 Kopanong
 Lekhalong
 Lekhalong (Terai Hoek)
 Letsatseng (Ha Ntami)
 Likhohloaneng
 Limapa (Ha Lemeke)
 Limapa (Ha Mosehle)
 Litšinabelong
 Mahlachaneng
 Majakaneng
 Makhalong
 Makhetheng
 Makoabating
 Masoetseng
 Matšela-Beli
 Matsoapong
 Matšoareng
 Meriting
 Motse-Mocha (Tšitsong)
 Mphaki (Ha 'Maletsoai)
 Mphaki (Ha Morulane)
 Mphaki (Makhalong)
 Nokong (Ha Nchaka)
 Paballong
 Paballong (Pontšeng)
 Phahameng (Ha Tlali)
 Pholeng
 Phuthing (Ha Rampeo)
 Pulane (Khohlong)
 Pulane (Letlapeng)
 Pulane (Moreneng)
 Pulane (Thabaneng)
 Raohang (Ha Hlotse)
 Rolong (Ha Masiu)
 Rothe
 Sekhutloaneng
 Sekokoaneng
 Selomong
 Thaba-Chitja
 Thabang
 Thabong (Tšitsong)
 Tiping
 Tlapaneng
 Tlokoeng (Ha Mokhethi)
 Tšethe
 Tšieng
 Tšitsong (Liphakoeng)
 Tšitsong (Phatlalla)
 Tšitsong (Raohang)
 Tšoeneng (Tšitsong)

References

External links
 Google map of community villages

Populated places in Quthing District